Jacobello di Bonomo (active 1370–90) was an Italian painter, active in an early Renaissance style.

Little is known about his biography, and he appears to be referred to by various authors under different names, such as Jacobello  or Jacometto del Fiore by the abbot Luigi Lanzi.

While he apparently trained in Venice, there are no identifiable works there. He is best known for a large and colorful polyptych of the Virgin and Child with 14 Saints (1385), located at Santarcangelo di Romagna. It is housed in the Civic Museum in the Palazzo Cenci of Santarcangelo. Some art critics suggest the influence of Lorenzo Veneziano. Other sources point to him working for or alongside Giovanni da Bologna.

References

14th-century Italian painters
Italian male painters
Painters from Venice
Year of death unknown
Year of birth unknown